Dark Glasses is a 2022 giallo film directed and co-written by Dario Argento, in his first directorial work since Dracula 3D (2012). From a screenplay written by Argento with Franco Ferrini and Carlo Lucarelli, Dark Glasses stars Ilenia Pastorelli as an Italian escort who is attacked and blinded by a serial killer in an attempted murder. While escaping the attack by car, she meets a young Chinese boy (Andrea Zhang) who assists her in her lack of sight. Argento's daughter, Asia Argento, appears in the film, and also serves as the film's associate producer.

An international co-production of Italy and France, Dark Glasses premiered at the 72nd Berlin International Film Festival on 11 February 2022. It was released theatrically in Italy on 24 February 2022.

Cast
 Ilenia Pastorelli as Diana
 Asia Argento as Rita
  as Matteo
 Mario Pirrello as Chief Inspector Aleardi
 Maria Rosaria Russo as Inspector Bajani
 Gennaro Iaccarino as Inspector Baldacci
 Xinyu Zhang as Chin

Production
The idea for Dark Glasses dates back to 2002, with Vittorio Cecchi Gori originally set to serve as the film's producer. Following the bankruptcy of Cecchi Gori's company, the script was shelved until Dario Argento's daughter, Asia Argento, rediscovered it while writing her 2021 autobiography Anatomy of a Wild Heart.

French electronic music duo Daft Punk was initially attached to compose the score, but were replaced by Arnaud Rebotini after breaking up in 2021.

Release
A teaser trailer for the film was released on 8 February 2022. A full trailer was released on 10 February.

Dark Glasses had its world premiere at the 72nd Berlin International Film Festival (Berlinale) on 11 February 2022. It was released theatrically in Italy on 24 February 2022.

The film was made available for streaming in North America, the United Kingdom and Ireland, Australia and New Zealand, debuting on the streaming service Shudder on 13 October 2022.

Reception
On the review aggregator website Rotten Tomatoes, the film holds an approval rating of 52% based on 46 reviews, with an average rating of 5.4/10. The site's consensus reads, "While it's far from Dario Argento's best, Dark Glassess may be worth a look for fans hungry for another horrific helping from a master of his craft".

Reviewing the film after its premiere at Berlinale, Anna Smith of Deadline Hollywood noted "an uncomfortable erotic gaze during attack scenes (if it is meant to be pastiche, it doesn't work)", and wrote that it "lacks the suspense and style of Argento's work in the 70s and 80s, while repeating various themes [...] most of it just reminds you how much better Argento was in the old days." Peter Bradshaw of The Guardian gave the film a score of two out of five stars, commending its opening sequence but calling it "bizarre in the wrong ways, with clunkingly absurd plot transitions", and writing that "the director is not particularly interested in the idea of Diana changing or growing as a person in the course of all this." The Daily Telegraphs Tim Robey also gave the film two out of five stars, lamenting Argento's perceived lack of "interest in learning new tricks" and criticizing the performance of the dog that plays Diana's guide dog.

Varietys Michael Nordine wrote that, "while only those blindly devoted to [Argento] will fail to see how patently ridiculous his latest offering is, only those immune to the puerile charm of attack dogs, eclipses and water snakes will fail to enjoy Dark Glasses even a little." Ben Croll of IndieWire gave the film a grade of "B+", calling it "a spiky little giallo that wants nothing more than to be labeled a return-to-form. If it falls ever-so-short, you've got to give it points for trying." Jordan Mintzer of The Hollywood Reporter concluded that, "Dark Glasses is never all that scary, and some of it is just plain silly, but if you take it at face value it can be enjoyable enough to sit through—more of a reminder of what Argento used to do best than an example in its own right."

References

External links
 
 

2022 films
2022 horror thriller films
2020s French films
2020s Italian films
2020s Italian-language films
2020s serial killer films
Films about blind people
Films about prostitution in Italy
Films directed by Dario Argento
Films set in Rome
Films shot in Rome
Films with screenplays by Dario Argento
French horror thriller films
French serial killer films
Giallo films
Italian serial killer films
Rai Cinema films
Shudder (streaming service) original programming